Abed Jabarin (born December 19, 1998) is an Arab-Israeli footballer who plays for Hapoel Umm al-Fahm.

Jabarin made his debut for Netanya on November 28, 2015, in a league game against Maccabi Haifa.

External links
 

1998 births
Living people
Israeli footballers
Maccabi Netanya F.C. players
Hapoel Jerusalem F.C. players
Ironi Tiberias F.C. players
Hapoel Umm al-Fahm F.C. players
Israeli Premier League players
Liga Leumit players
Footballers from Umm al-Fahm
Association football forwards
Association football midfielders